Things Are Swingin'  is an album by singer Peggy Lee with music arranged and conducted by Jack Marshall.

Track listing
 "It's a Wonderful World" (Harold Adamson, Jan Savitt, Johnny Watson) – 2:14
 "Things Are Swingin'" (Peggy Lee, Jack Marshall) – 2:12
 "Alright, Okay, You Win" (Mayme Watts, Sidney Wyche) – 2:53
 "Ridin' High" (Cole Porter) – 2:10
 "It's Been a Long, Long Time" (Sammy Cahn, Jule Styne) – 2:19
 "Lullaby in Rhythm" (Benny Goodman, Walter Hirsch, Clarence Profit, Edgar Sampson) – 2:16
 "Alone Together" (Arthur Schwartz, Howard Dietz) – 2:07
 "I'm Beginning to See the Light" (Duke Ellington, Don George, Johnny Hodges, Harry James) – 1:48
 "It's a Good, Good Night" (Lee) – 1:56
 "You're Getting to Be a Habit with Me" (Al Dubin, Harry Warren) – 2:42
 "You're Mine, You" (Johnny Green, Edward Heyman) – 1:48
 "Life Is for Livin'" (Cahn, Jimmy Van Heusen) – 3:13

The 2004 CD re-release includes the bonus tracks "You Don't Know" and "Fever".

Personnel
 Peggy Lee – vocals
 Uan Rasey – trumpet
 Pete Candoli – trumpet
 Don Fagerquist – trumpet
 Conrad Gozzo – trumpet
 Mannie Klein – trumpet
 Milt Bernhart – trombone
 Bob Enevoldsen – valve trombone
 Justin Gordon – reeds
 Joe Harnell – piano
 Howard Roberts – guitar
 Barney Kessel – guitar
 Joe Mondragon – double bass
 Shelly Manne – drums

References

1959 albums
Peggy Lee albums
Capitol Records albums
Albums arranged by Jack Marshall (composer)
Albums produced by Milt Gabler
Albums conducted by Jack Marshall